Paul Fournelle (born 11 October 1884, date of death unknown) was a Luxembourgian athlete. He competed in the men's long jump at the 1912 Summer Olympics.

References

1884 births
Year of death missing
Athletes (track and field) at the 1912 Summer Olympics
Luxembourgian male long jumpers
Olympic athletes of Luxembourg
Place of birth missing